Betsy Atkins is an American business executive and entrepreneur. She was the former chairman and chief executive officer (CEO) of Clear Standards, Inc., a software provider. In 2010, Clear Standards was acquired by SAP. She is president and chief executive officer (CEO) of Baja Corp, a venture capital investment firm, that she founded in 1993. Atkins is on the board of directors of Wynn Resorts and Volvo Car Corporation. She previously served as chairman of the SAP AG advisory board and was a member of the ZocDoc advisory board. She was a member of the NASDAQ LLC Exchange board of directors and is a member of Florida International University's Health Care Network board of directors. Atkins is a member of the Council on Foreign Relations. Atkins frequently appears on CNBC, Bloomberg and Yahoo Finance as a corporate governance commentator.

Early life 
Atkins was born in the suburbs of Boston and went to a public high school. She attended the University of Massachusetts Amherst. Her early career was in the industrial automation and semiconductor industry at General Electric. Atkins often credits her mother for encouraging her throughout her career to aspire to do great things and always be committed to giving back and helping others on their career paths and life journeys.

Career
Atkins co-founded Interlan, an Ethernet network controller card systems company.  The company was acquired by Micom Systems in 1985.  In 1988, Atkins became the CEO of Key Computer Labs, selling the company to Amdahl Corporation.

In 1989, she co-founded Ascend Communications and served as a board member and their Global CRO and EVP marketing and services.  Ascend was acquired by Lucent in 1999.  Atkins joined the Lucent board in 2000.

Atkins became the CEO of NCI, Inc. a nutraceutical functional food company, building the company until it was acquired by Artal Luxembourg in 1993.

Atkins recent work has been in corporate governance, where she has served as an expert witness on the Adelphia bankruptcy case in 2003 and as chairman of the Special Litigation Committee at HealthSouth Corporation.

Board work 
Atkins has served on more than 27 public boards and various private boards and a number of private equity and venture-backed boards in various industries. Atkins has been through 13 IPOs and has directorship experiences in America, Canada, France, China, and Sweden. According to a Harvard study, Atkins has served on the second most public boards of any woman.

Books 
Atkins released her first book, Behind Boardroom Doors: Lessons of a Corporate Director in 2013. The book offers candid and practical advice for those who serve on the boards of global, complex enterprises. In 2017, Atkins released an updated version of the book which includes new material about cybersecurity and digitization.

In 2019 Betsy Atkins published her third book Be Board Ready: The Secrets To Landing A Board Seat And Being A Great Director.

TV appearances 
Atkins has appeared on CNBC, Bloomberg and Yahoo Finance as a Corporate Governance expert commentator.

Atkins has commentated on the role of the CBS board and its special committee review of Les Moonves.

Forbes 
Atkins is a regular Forbes contributor. Her area of focus includes corporate governance & business trends.

Other work and ventures 
Atkins is an active proponent of women leadership in corporate settings. Atkins mentors women individually and especially on the boards where she serves. In 2018 she hosted a Women in Leadership luncheon at Volvo HQ in Sweden. 

Atkins joined the Wynn Resorts board of directors in 2018 and participated in the inaugural launch event of the Wynn Resorts Women's Leadership Forum.

Women Inc. Magazine named Betsy Atkins a 2018 Most Influential Corporate Director.

In 2018, Atkins was a featured speaker at the CEO2CEO Summit in NYC.

Atkins was a panelist speaker at the 2018 Nasdaq Advancing Women Leaders in the Boardroom conference.

Education 
Atkins received a bachelor's degree in liberal arts from the University of Massachusetts Amherst, magna cum laude, Phi Beta Kappa.

Controversy: Maine beach access 
In June 2014, Atkins, president of Gables Real Estate, LLC, purchased Cedar Beach Road, required for public access to a private beach on Bailey Island, Maine and vowed to keep it private.

A nonprofit group formed to encourage access and after exhausting all avenues, a lawsuit was filed for usage. A Maine court granted a prescriptive easement to town residents to access a private road in order to gain beach access after demonstrating nine decades of continuous usage by locals and summer residents.

On July 19, 2016, the Maine Law Court vacated the lower court's decision to grant a prescriptive easement across Cedar Beach Road; therefore, it is now wholly private and its use may be determined by the owner, Gables Real Estate, LLC. Atkins has indicated that she will decide whether or not to continue to allow public access to the beach on an annual basis. The town has worked to protect the beach for all by providing beach monitors.

Prior board of directors
2017–2018: Atkins served on the board of directors of Cognizant

 Member of the finance committee.

2013–2018: Atkins served on the board of directors of HD Supply

 Lead independent director. 
 Chair of the governance committee.

1999–2016: Atkins served on the board of directors of Polycom

 Lead independent director. 
 Chair of the compensation committee.

2014–2015: Atkins served on the board of directors of Darden Restaurants, an American multi-brand restaurant operator.

 Member of the governance committee.

2013–2014: Atkins served on the board of directors of Wix.com a freemium based website creation business in Israel.

 Member of the compensation committee.

2005–2012: Atkins served on the board of SunPower Corporation

 Lead independent director. 
 Chair of the compensation committee.

2004–2013: Atkins served on the board of Chico's

 Chair of the governance committee.

2004–2010: Atkins served on the board of Reynolds American, Inc.

2002–2008: Atkins served on the board of directors of UTStarcom, developer of wireless infrastructure and cellular hand sets selling to China and developing countries.

 Member of the governance committee.

2005–2006: Atkins served on the board of directors of Vonage a VoIP telephony provider based in Holmdel, New Jersey.

 Member of the governance committee.

2001–2004: Atkins served on the board of directors of Paychex a national provider of payroll, human resource and benefits services.

2001–2003: Atkins served on the board of Secure Computing.

2000–2002: Atkins served on the board of Lucent Technologies.

References

External links
 Forbes.com

Living people
American women chief executives
University of Massachusetts Amherst alumni
1953 births
21st-century American women